Another Thin Man is a 1939 American detective film directed by W. S. Van Dyke, the third of six in the Thin Man series. It again stars William Powell and Myrna Loy as Nick and Nora Charles and is based on Dashiell Hammett's Continental Op story "The Farewell Murder". The Charles' son Nicky Jr. is introduced for the first time. The cast includes their terrier Asta, Virginia Grey, Otto Kruger, C. Aubrey Smith, Ruth Hussey, Nat Pendleton, Patric Knowles, Sheldon Leonard, Tom Neal, Phyllis Gordon and Marjorie Main. Shemp Howard appears in an uncredited role as Wacky.

The film was unable to be called Return of the Thin Man because The Thin Man from the original film was "completely dead" according to newspapers in 1939. It was followed by Shadow of the Thin Man (1941).

Plot
Nick and Nora Charles are back in New York with Asta and their son Nicky Jr. They are invited by Colonel Burr MacFay to spend the weekend at his house on Long Island. MacFay, the former business partner of Nora's father and the administrator of her fortune, desperately wants Nick to put his well-known detective skills to work, as he has been receiving death threats from a shady character named Phil Church. When MacFay is killed, Church seems to be the obvious suspect, but Nick is skeptical, suspecting more than a simple murder. MacFay's housekeeper, his adopted daughter, and various hangers-on all may have had an interest in killing him.

Cast
 William Powell as Nick Charles
 Myrna Loy as Nora Charles
 Virginia Grey as Lois MacFay
 Otto Kruger as Assistant District Attorney Van Slack
 C. Aubrey Smith as Colonel Burr MacFay
 Ruth Hussey as Dorothy Walters, Charles' nanny
 Nat Pendleton as Lieutenant Guild
 Patric Knowles as Dudley Horn, Lois's fiancé
 Tom Neal as Freddie Coleman, MacFay's secretary
 Phyllis Gordon as Mrs. Isabella Bellam, MacFay's housekeeper
 Sheldon Leonard as Phil Church
 Don Costello as Diamond Back Vogel
 Harry Bellaver as Creeps
 Muriel Hutchison as Smitty
 Abner Biberman as Dum-Dum
 Marjorie Main as Mrs. Dolley
 Shemp Howard as Wacky (uncredited)
 The Afro-Cuban dance team of René and Estela, headliners at the Havana-Madrid Club in New York City, is featured in the floor show at the West Indies Club.

Reception
The film review aggregator website Rotten Tomatoes show's the film score to be 85% based on reviews from 20 professional critics.

According to Frank S. Nugent, "this third of the trademarked Thin Men takes its murders as jauntily as ever, confirms our impression that matrimony need not be too serious a business, and provides as light an entertainment as any holiday-amusement seeker is likely to find".

Another Thin Man is the third of six feature films based on the characters of Nick and Nora Charles:
 The Thin Man (1934)
 After the Thin Man (1936)
 Another Thin Man (1939)
 Shadow of the Thin Man (1941)
 The Thin Man Goes Home (1945)
 Song of the Thin Man (1947)

Box office
Another Thin Man grossed a domestic and foreign total of $2,223,000: $1,523,000 from the U.S. and Canada and $700,000 elsewhere. It returned a profit of $394,000.

References

External links

 
 
 
 

1939 films
1930s mystery films
American black-and-white films
American comedy thriller films
American crime comedy-drama films
American detective films
American mystery films
American sequel films
Films directed by W. S. Van Dyke
Metro-Goldwyn-Mayer films
Patricide in fiction
The Thin Man films
1930s crime comedy-drama films
1930s comedy thriller films
Films scored by Edward Ward (composer)
1930s English-language films
1930s American films